Pallath Joseph Kurien (born 31 March 1941) is an Indian politician, a social worker and educationist. He was the Deputy Chairman of the Rajya Sabha, the upper house of the Parliament of India, till his retirement on 30 June 2018. A leader of the Indian National Congress party, Kurien previously served as a Union Minister in the P. V. Narasimha Rao government and was a member of the Lok Sabha for six consecutive terms from 1980 to 1999.
He was elected to the Rajya Sabha in 2005.

Early life
P. J. Kurien was born on 31 March 1941 to P. G. Joseph and Rachel Joseph at Vennikulam in Tiruvalla, Pathanamthitta District, Kerala. He had his early education at St. Behanas High School, Vennikulam. For higher education, he attended St. Thomas College, Kozhencherry, Kerala and at Government Science College, Rewa, Madhya Pradesh. He was a professor of physics at St. Thomas College, Kozhencherry, when he entered politics.

Positions held
 1980-84 Member, Seventh Lok Sabha.
 1984-89 Member, Eighth Lok Sabha.
 1987-89 Member, Executive, Congress Parliamentary Party [C.P.P.(I)], Member, House Committee, Member, Committee on Public Undertakings.
 1989-91 Member, Ninth Lok Sabha, Chief Whip, Congress Parliamentary Party, Member of the Business Advisory Committee.
 1991-96 Member, Tenth Lok Sabha.
 1991-93 Union Minister of State, Industry with additional charge of Commerce.
 1992-93 Union Minister of State, Industry,(Department of Small Scale, Agro and Rural Industries) with additional charge of Commerce.
 1994-98 Chairman, Board of Governors, Indian Institute of Technology, Delhi.
 1995-96 Union Minister of State, Non-Conventional Energy Sources.
 1996-98 Member, Eleventh Lok Sabha, Member of the Business Advisory Committee.
 1998-99 Member, Twelfth Lok Sabha, Chief Whip, Congress Parliamentary Party, Member, Business Advisory Committee, Jan.
 July 2005 Elected to Rajya Sabha
 August 2012 Elected Deputy Chairman of Rajya Sabha

Controversy
Kurien was alleged to be an accused in the Suryanelli rape case, though his name was never included in the list of accused. There are four inquiries which exonerated Kurien, three inquiries were held under the Chief Ministership of E. K. Nayanar, who himself used the allegation against Kurien during 1996 elections, and was also a respondent in the defamation case filed by Kurien. During these three inquiries, Kurien was only an opposition MP; Congress Party being out of power both at the Centre and in Kerala.  Kurien has maintained his innocence and police investigations into the case have also deemed him innocent. There are speculations such as the alleged controversy against Kurien is politically motivated and his political power even led to the exoneration. Sessions Judge Abraham Mathew in his order held that the victim's plea for inclusion of Kurien in the sex scandal case was not maintainable.

References

 http://www.thehindu.com/news/national/suryanelli-victims-plea-against-kurien-dismissed/article4863280.ece
 http://zeenews.india.com/news/kerala/suryanelli-sex-scandal-breather-for-pj-kurien-as-convict-retracts-claim_851672.html

External links
 Profile on Rajya Sabha website
 

|-

|-

|-

1941 births
India MPs 1980–1984
India MPs 1984–1989
India MPs 1989–1991
India MPs 1991–1996
India MPs 1996–1997
India MPs 1998–1999
Indian National Congress politicians from Kerala
Living people
Lok Sabha members from Kerala
People from Pathanamthitta district
Rajya Sabha members from Kerala
Deputy Chairman of the Rajya Sabha
Indian National Congress (U) politicians